Sulphur Springs is an unincorporated community located in Douglas County, Oregon.

There was formerly a post office located there.

References

Unincorporated communities in Douglas County, Oregon
Unincorporated communities in Oregon